NAD(P)H-hydrate epimerase (NAD(P)HX epimerase) is an enzyme with systematic name (6R)-6beta-hydroxy-1,4,5,6-tetrahydronicotinamide-adenine dinucleotide 6-epimerase. This enzyme catalyses the following chemical reaction

(1) (6R)-6beta-hydroxy-1,4,5,6-tetrahydronicotinamide-adenine dinucleotide  (6S)-6beta-hydroxy-1,4,5,6-tetrahydronicotinamide-adenine dinucleotide
(2) (6R)-6beta-hydroxy-1,4,5,6-tetrahydronicotinamide-adenine dinucleotide phosphate  (6S)-6beta-hydroxy-1,4,5,6-tetrahydronicotinamide-adenine dinucleotide phosphate

The enzyme can use either (R)-NADH-hydrate or (R)-NADPH-hydrate as a substrate.

References

External links 
 

EC 5.1.99